Jane Ann "Janie" Sell (born October 1, 1939, in Detroit, Michigan) is an American actress.

Career
Sell won the Tony Award for Best Featured Actress in a Musical for Over Here!, which also starred the then-surviving Andrews Sisters Maxene and Patty, and introduced John Travolta and Marilu Henner to Broadway. She also appeared in George M!, I Love My Wife, Irene, Dames at Sea and a revival of Pal Joey. She appeared off-Broadway in Kurt Vonnegut's God Bless You, Mr. Rosewater in 1979 at the Entermedia Theater. The musical comedy version of Vonnegut's novel was adapted and directed by Howard Ashman, with music by Alan Menken, and lyrics by Ashman and Dennis Green.

She substituted for Carol Burnett in each Wednesday matinée performance of the comedy Moon Over Buffalo, which co-starred Philip Bosco, in the mid-1990s.

Acting credits

Theatre

Television and film

References

External links

1939 births
Living people
American musical theatre actresses
American stage actresses
American television actresses
Actresses from Detroit
Theatre World Award winners
Tony Award winners
21st-century American women